The Chengdu Challenger is a professional tennis tournament played on hard courts. It is currently part of the ATP Challenger Tour. It is held annually in Chengdu, China, since 2016.

Past finals

Singles

Doubles

References

 
ATP Challenger Tour
Hard court tennis tournaments
Tennis tournaments in China